Above the Buried Cry is the first album of American band Æon Spoke, led by Paul Masvidal and Sean Reinert. Seven tracks from this album were re-recorded on the self-titled album in 2007.

Track listing 
All tracks by Paul Masvidal

 "No Answers" – 3:46
 "Pablo at the Park" – 5:15
 "Suicide Boy" – 3:34
 "Grace" – 5:54
 "Silence" – 4:22
 "Emmanuel" – 4:38
 "Face the Wind" – 5:37
 "For Good" – 4:11
 "Nothing" – 5:33
 "Yellowman" – 3:46

Personnel 
 Paul Masvidal – Vocals, Guitar
 Sean Reinert – Drums, Percussion, Keyboards & Backing Vocals
 Evo – Guitar
 Stephen Gambina – Bass

External links
 Above the Buried Cry album info at Discogs

Æon Spoke albums
2004 debut albums